Chak no 42 M.B is a small village in Khushab District, Punjab, Pakistan.

Location 
It is the seat of the union council of Botala. It is one of the fourteen villages that were settled after gaining independence in 1947.

Demography 
Army officers, junior commission officers, and soldiers were first settled in Chack no. 42 MB, which was known as 3 Chack Faujianwal at the time. Some civilian families also settled there later on. Chaudry Nabi Bukhsh Arain, Chaudry Ismail Arain, Subedar Rana Nazir Ahmed, Haveldar Muhammad Akber, and Allahi Bukhsh founded the village. Arain, Rajput, Khilgi, Jat, Rana, Malik, Khoher, and Shakh families live in this village. Chak no 42 M.B is a planned village with straight streets. The major governmental facility in the village is the union council office. A road connects this village with Mitha Tiwana and Botala in the west, and all thirteen chacks, district city Khushab, and Juaharabad in the east.

References 

Populated places in Khushab District